Mya Baker (aka Mya B.; born 1974) is an American filmmaker, poet, writer, director and researcher. She was born and raised in Chicago, Illinois, and has lived and taught early childhood education in Brooklyn, New York.

Biography
Baker was born and raised in Chicago, Illinois to an electrical engineer father and mother who worked for the EPA. She grew up around positive Black male and female role models, but also experienced racism while growing up. She said in an interview: "I remember so clearly, when I was 5 years old, my mother, my brother and I were chased out of a Chicago neighborhood called Bridgeport when we were young. A gang of boys were waiting for us as we walked out of this church, and they started chasing us with bats and bricks yelling, 'Nigger go home!

Baker studied film at Columbia College in Chicago, Illinois, and later founded production company Shoot Films Not People. Her films have been shown at film festivals. She has also worked as a Special Education preschool teacher in Brooklyn, New York.
Baker stated in an article on Patch.com that she creates films to begin the healing process for Black men and women, and for society. Two of her films- Afraid of Dark and Silence: In search of Black Female Sexuality in America- have focused on undoing stereotypes of Black men and women.

Baker is best known for Silence: In Search of Black Female Sexuality in America. In this film she interviewed Nzingha Steward and Little X, two directors in the Black music video industry. During the interview they discuss the impact of the 'video hoe' image on society. The film takes a journey into American history and slavery that unveils hidden sexual relations between enslaved Africans and slave owners. The film educates the public to the historical and contemporary racial tensions and injustices in America in regards to Black males. Baker shares her experiences, and interviews black males from all walks of life spanning three generations.

Filmography
 1994 - Warrior Queens - Baker's first documentary short which was shown at the Dusable Museum of African American History in Chicago.
 2004 - Silence: In search of Black Female Sexuality in America; with interviews with Nzingha Stewart, Dr. Hilda Hutcherson, Dr. Lliala Afrika, Little X, Professor Trisha Rose, Punany Poets, Rev. Jeremiah Wright. In this film she explores past and present sexual myths about Black women. Segments of the film were shown on VH1's “Can’t Get a Date”, in 2006.
 2010 - Maya Illusion is a short film starring Angelo Boyke and Sophia Loren Coffee; Directed by Mya Baker and Co-Directed by Amy Werber. This film short is an about a young woman who falls in love with a pretty face to find out later that the pretty face has HIV. 
 2014 Afraid of Dark. This film confronts negative stereotypes of Black males with interviews with rappers, actors, and politicians that talk about their experiences with racism and injustices. In the film are interviews with Lou Myers, Malik Yoba, Sadat X, Sam Greenlee, Tom Burrell, Vondie Curtis Hall, Cornel West, Khalil G. Muhammad, General Steele, Kenya K. Stevens, and Kevin Powell.

Honors
2004 - Telly Award for her documentary Silence: In Search of Black Female Sexuality in America
2006 - BET finalist in the Rap It-Up Competition
2018- Screencraft Horror Competition, Semifinalist
2019 - Screencraft Screenwriting Fellowship, Semifinalist
2018 - Script Pipeline Screenplay Competition, Semifinalist
2020 - Filmmatic Horror Screenplay Awards (Season 4), Finalist

References

External links
Afraid of Dark Film Trailer
Peter Gunz - "Fatherhood"

Living people
1974 births
African-American film directors
African-American film producers
African-American screenwriters
Screenwriters from New York (state)
Film producers from New York (state)
People from Chicago
Writers from Brooklyn
American women screenwriters
American women film directors
Film directors from New York City
Film directors from Illinois
Screenwriters from Illinois
American women film producers
Film producers from Illinois
Columbia College Chicago alumni
21st-century African-American people
21st-century African-American women
20th-century African-American people
20th-century African-American women
African-American women writers